Matthew Gono (born May 10, 1996) is an American football offensive tackle who is a free agent. He played college football at Wesley College. He went undrafted and signed with the Atlanta Falcons. Gono also played for the New York Giants.

Professional career

Atlanta Falcons
Gono signed with the Atlanta Falcons as an undrafted free agent on May 1, 2018. He made the Falcons initial 53-man roster but did not play in a regular season game and was inactive for all but the Falcons' final game of the season.

The Falcons placed a second-round restricted free agent tender on Gono on March 17, 2021. He signed the one-year contract on March 25.

Gono was placed on the reserve/physically unable to perform list to start the 2021 season after undergoing surgery in the offseason.

On January 28, 2022, Gono was released by the Falcons.

New York Giants
On March 9, 2022, Gono signed a one-year contract with the New York Giants. On August 3, 2022, Gono was placed on left squad/exempt list. Two days later, on August 5, it was revealed that Gono's neck condition could end his career playing football. His contract was terminated by the New York Giants on August 8, 2022.

References

External links
Atlanta Falcons bio
Wesley Wolverines bio

1996 births
Living people
American football offensive tackles
Atlanta Falcons players
Cinnaminson High School alumni
New York Giants players
People from Cinnaminson Township, New Jersey
Players of American football from New Jersey
Sportspeople from Burlington County, New Jersey
Wesley Wolverines football players